WRTI (90.1 FM) is a non-commercial, public radio station licensed to serve Philadelphia, Pennsylvania. It is a service of Temple University. The Temple University Board of Trustees holds the station's license.

History
WRTI began in 1948 as an AM carrier current station. It was founded by John Roberts, professor emeritus of communications at Temple and long-time anchorman at WFIL-TV (now WPVI-TV). He helped found the School of Communications and Theater at Temple. The call letters stood for "Radio Training Institute." In 1952, the station received an FM transmitter, receiving a full license to cover the FM facility in 1953. After years of serving as a student laboratory, WRTI-AM signed off for good in 1968. WRTI-FM switched from block programming to an all-jazz format in 1969. In late 1997, after Philadelphia's commercial classical music station, WFLN, changed formats, WRTI switched to a dual-format service, providing classical music from 6 AM to 6 PM, and jazz from 6 PM to 6 AMs, except Sunday mornings, when it broadcasts Christian gospel and spiritual music.

Programming
WRTI is a music-intensive public radio service, broadcasting classical music during the day, and jazz at night, and Christian spiritual music on Sunday.

The station features hosts Kevin Gordon, John T.K. Scherch, Bob Perkins, Melinda Whiting, Bob Craig, Maureen Malloy, Joe Patti, I. Robin "Bobbi" Booker, Courtney Blue, Rich Gunning, Mark Pinto, and Mike Bolton. Long-time jazz host Jeff Duperon died on June 17, 2019. He was 66. Mid-day classical music host Bliss Michelson died on March 14, 2021, due to complications from COVID-19 at the age of 71. Debra Lew Harder left the station on September 21, 2021, to become the host of the Metropolitan Opera radio broadcasts.

After a long hiatus, WRTI, in 2013, resumed broadcasting full-length concerts by the Philadelphia Orchestra Sunday afternoon. Recorded each week at the Kimmel Center's Verizon Hall in Center City, this series brings the distinctive sound of the "Fabulous Philadelphians" in performance back to the Delaware Valley airwaves.

WRTI presents in-concert performances of South Jersey's Symphony In C Orchestra, the Chamber Orchestra of Philadelphia, the Philadelphia Youth Orchestra, The Crossing and others, as well as opera performances from the Academy of Vocal Arts, OperaDelaware and the Opera Company of Philadelphia.

WRTI is a network affiliate of NPR, PRI and APM, airing news and arts programming from these networks. Programs include NPR's Newscast Service, From The Top, and SymphonyCast. WRTI is also an affiliate of the WFMT Radio Network, broadcasting a wide range of programming from this Chicago-based syndicator including concert broadcasts from the Chicago Symphony Orchestra, New York Philharmonic, San Francisco Symphony, the Deutsche Welle Festival Concert series, and many more programs and concert series on both the analog FM service and the digital HD2 service.

WRTI is also an affiliate of the Toll Brothers-Metropolitan Opera Radio Network, airing the Met's Saturday Matinee performances live from December through May each year. In the Met's off-season, WRTI broadcasts the American Opera Series from the WFMT Radio Network. This series features performances by the San Francisco, Los Angeles and Houston Grand Operas, as well as the Lyric Opera of Chicago.  With these series, WRTI broadcasts a full-length opera every Saturday afternoon.  WRTI's Mark Pinto hosts Overture, an opera "pre-game" of sorts, playing opera-based music, Saturday at 12-noon, just before the Saturday Opera Broadcast.

WRTI was known for several popular arts and culture based shows over the years.  The multi-award-winning CrossOver, hosted by former classical host Jill Pasternak, explored music as "the universal language." The show, which presented music and conversation with some of the world's greatest artists and personalities, focused not only on classical and jazz, but also music in the periphery of those two art forms. Featured have been Michel Legrand, Rick Braun, Byron Janis, Billy Joel, Eric Whitacre, Marvin Hamlisch, Michael Feinstein, Louis Lortie, Herbie Hancock, Yolanda Kondonassis, Branford Marsalis, Michael Bublé and many more.  The show was produced from 1998 until Ms. Pasternak's retirement in 2015.  Dr. Jack Buerkle, a member of the Temple University faculty and jazz expert, was co-host until his retirement in 2003.

The award-winning Creatively Speaking general-arts segments featured contributors Jim Cotter, David Patrick Stearns and Susan Lewis among others. Mr. Cotter formerly headed WRTI's Arts and Culture desk. The forerunner of these features was a 30-minute Saturday morning arts magazine show, also called Creatively Speaking, which was cancelled in early 2013. It was felt that splitting up the show in segments and spreading them throughout the broadcast day and week would better serve the audience. The features ended in 2018.

Discoveries From the Fleisher Collection, first aired in 2001, was hosted by Kile Smith, former curator of the Edwin A. Fleisher Collection of Orchestral Music at the Free Library of Philadelphia, the largest lending library of orchestral performance material in the world, and former WRTI classical host and program director, Jack Moore.  The program featured recordings of orchestral scores and music housed at the Fleisher Collection.  The program, a co-production of the Fleisher Collection and WRTI, was cancelled in 2018.

The Wanamaker Organ Hour, first aired in 2005, featured recordings of performances by Macy's Grand Court Organist Peter Richard Conte and various guests. The Wanamaker Organ is housed in Macy's Center City Philadelphia department store and is the largest musical instrument in the world. The program was co-produced by the Friends of the Wanamaker Organ and WRTI, and was an outgrowth of a segment, and later a live remote broadcast, on the CrossOver program. The Friends organization is responsible for the restoration and upkeep of this grand instrument. The show ended in 2017 when funding to the Friends was cut.

Along with its regular analog FM signal, WRTI also broadcasts using HD Radio. Two WRTI network stations (WRTI and WRTJ) broadcast HD2 programming as well. Known as "WRTI-HD2," this auxiliary service broadcasts Jazz in the daytime and Classical music at night, opposite the station's analog/HD1 signal, thus providing a full 24 hours of classical and jazz programming for those with HD Radio receivers. The programming of both WRTI and WRTI-HD2 also comprises two separate web audio streams. The "All-Classical" stream presents WRTI's daytime programming, switching to WRTI-HD2's programming at night. The "All-Jazz" stream broadcasts WRTI-HD2's daytime programming, switching to WRTI's analog/HD1 signal at night. The web streams have proven popular with those who do not have an HD Radio receiver or are not within the coverage area of WRTI and WRTJ.

Simulcasts
WRTI fronts a network of six full-powered repeater stations. Combined with the main WRTI signal and numerous low-powered translators, their footprint covers much of eastern Pennsylvania, as well as most of Delaware and the southern half of New Jersey.

Notes:

Translators
Three full-power stations have translators that are licensed to simulcast the programming of their respective stations.

See also

 List of jazz radio stations in the United States

References

External links
 
 WRTI Old Gang website
 The Beginning of WRTI-FM

RTI
Temple University
RTI
NPR member stations
NPR member networks
Classical music radio stations in the United States
Jazz radio stations in the United States
Radio stations established in 1953
1953 establishments in Pennsylvania